Angelina Ignatjeva (born 9 September 1990) is a Latvian footballer who plays as a forward. She has been a member of the Latvia women's national team.

References

1990 births
Living people
Latvian women's footballers
Women's association football forwards
FC Skonto/Cerība-46.vsk. players
2. Frauen-Bundesliga players
Latvia women's youth international footballers
Latvia women's international footballers
Latvian expatriate footballers
Latvian expatriate sportspeople in Germany
Expatriate women's footballers in Germany